The Dean of Canterbury is the head of the Chapter of the Cathedral of Christ Church, Canterbury, England. The current office of Dean originated after the English Reformation, although Deans had also existed before this time; its immediate precursor office was the prior of the cathedral-monastery. The previous Dean, the Very Rev. Robert Willis, was appointed in 2001 and retired on 16 May 2022, a day before his 75th birthday, and it was announced on 8 May 2022 that the Rev. Jane Hedges, former Dean of Norwich, would serve as Acting Dean until a successor was appointed. The most recent Dean, David Monteith was appointed in 2022 and installed on December 17, 2022 and is the 40th Dean since the Reformation, though the position of Dean and Prior as the religious head of the community is almost identical so the line is unbroken back to the time of the foundation of the community by Saint Augustine in AD 597.

List of deans

820–1080

Version on show in the Cathedral (west end)
Ceolnoth 820
Aegelwyn 830
Alfric
Kensyn
Maurice
Aelfwyn 930
Alsine 935
Aelfwyn II 951
Athelsine
Aegelnoth 984 (Æthelnoth, later Archbishop of Canterbury)
Egelric 1020
Goderic 1058

Victoria County History, 1926
Cuba, occurs 798
Beornheard, occurs 805
Heahfrith, occurs 813
Ceolnoth, resigned 833
Æthelwine, occurs c. 860
Eadmund, occurs c.871
Æthelnoth, resigned 1020
Godric, occurs 1020, 1023
Æthelric, resigned 1058
Ælfric
Ælfsige
Ælfwine
Ælfwine
Kynsige
Maurice

Priors of Canterbury

About a century after becoming a monastic foundation late in the 10th century, the Cathedral started to be headed by a prior rather than a dean.  It would next have a dean after the Dissolution of the Monasteries.

Post-Reformation Deans

Early modern
1541–1567 Nicholas Wotton (the first dean; simultaneously Dean of York)
1567–1584 Thomas Godwin
1584–1597 Richard Rogers
1597–1615 Thomas Nevile
1615–1619 Charles Fotherby
1619–1625 John Boys
1625–1643 Isaac Bargrave
1643 George Aglionby
1643–1672 Thomas Turner
1672–1689 John Tillotson
1689–1691 John Sharp (afterwards Archbishop of York, 1691)
1691–1704 George Hooper
1704–1728 George Stanhope
1728–1733 Elias Sydall
1734–1760 John Lynch
1760–1766 William Freind
1766–1770 John Potter
1770–1771 Brownlow North
1771–1775 John Moore
1775–1781 The Hon James Cornwallis
1781–1790 George Horne
1790–1792 William Buller
1793–1797 Folliott Cornewall

Late modern
1797–1809 Thomas Powys
1809–1825 Gerrard Andrewes
1825–1827 Hugh Percy
1827–1845 Richard Bagot
1845–1857 William Lyall
1857–1871 Henry Alford
1871–1895 Robert Payne Smith
1895–1903 Frederic Farrar
1903–1924 Henry Wace
1924–1929 George Bell
1929–1931 Dick Sheppard
1931–1963 Hewlett Johnson
1963–1976 Ian White-Thomson
1976–1986 Victor de Waal
1986–2000 John Simpson
2000–2022 Robert Willis
2022−present David Monteith

References

External links
Fasti Ecclesiae Anglicanae 1541–1857: volume 3

 
Deans of Canterbury